Erickson may refer to:

Places
Canada
Erickson, Manitoba, a town
Erickson, British Columbia an unincorporated area
United States
Erickson Corner, Connecticut, an unincorporated community
Erickson Landing, Michigan, an unincorporated community
Erickson, Kenya, an unincorporated community

Other uses
Erickson (surname)
Erickson Inc., American aircraft manufacturer and operator
Erickson Living, American operator and developer of retirement communities

See also
Ericson or Ericsson (disambiguation)
Erikson (disambiguation)